St Stephen's Church, Borrowash is a parish church in the Church of England in Borrowash, Derbyshire.

History
The foundation stone was laid on 13 November 1889 by Mrs R.L. Farmer, wife of the vicar of All Saints' Church, Ockbrook. The church was built to the designs of the Derby-based architect Percy Heylyn Currey and constructed of heather brick. It consists of chancel, nave, organ chamber and vestry, with provision for about 200 people. The contractor was F. Slater of Derby. The wrought iron screen was presented by Mr. Edward H Pares of Hopwell Hall. The church-yard was laid out by Messrs William Barron and Son, landscape gardeners of Borrowash. The church was opened on 26 September 1890 by the Bishop of Southwell

Parish status

The church is in a joint parish with All Saints' Church, Ockbrook

War memorial
The church is noted for its war memorial which is Grade II listed  It is a calvary cross with stonework by Samuel Hodgkinson of Borrowash and a bronze sculpture of the crucified Christ by Alfred Mowbray and Company of Oxford. It was unveiled in October 1920 and dedicated by the Bishop of Derby.

Organ
When the church opened, accompaniment for services was provided by a harmonium. The first pipe organ was obtained second hand and installed by J.H. Adkins in 1913. A specification of the organ can be found on the National Pipe Organ Register.

See also
Listed buildings in Ockbrook and Borrowash

References

Borrowash
Churches completed in 1890